Chlorocala is a genus of beetles belonging to the family Scarabaeidae.

Description
They have an elongated body with various shades of iridescent green, red or purple colours. Males have a distinctive horn on the front head. The development of these beetles is relatively fast.

Distribution
This genus occurs in sub-Saharan Africa as far south as South Africa..

Species
Chlorocala affinis (Kraatz, 1880)
Chlorocala africana (Drury, 1773)
Chlorocala cinctipennis (Moser, 1903)
Chlorocala clypealis (Burgeon, 1934)
Chlorocala conjux (Harold, 1880)
Chlorocala guerini (Janson, 1888)
Chlorocala hypoxantha (Harold, 1879)
Chlorocala monoceros (Gory & Percheron, 1833)
Chlorocala nigricollis (Kraatz, 1880)
Chlorocala similis (Moser, 1907)
Chlorocala suturalis (Fabricius, 1775)
Chlorocala viridicyanea (Palisot de Beauvois, 1805)

References
 biolib